East of Piccadilly released in the US as The Strangler is a 1941 British mystery film based on a story by Gordon Beckles.  It was directed by Harold Huth and starring Judy Campbell, Sebastian Shaw, Niall MacGinnis, Henry Edwards, Martita Hunt, Charles Victor and Frederick Piper.

Plot
A series of murders in the West End of London baffle the officers of Scotland Yard and draw the interest of a crime reporter to the case.

Cast
 Judy Campbell as Penny Sutton  
 Sebastian Shaw as Tamsie Green  
 Niall MacGinnis as Joe  
 Henry Edwards as Inspector  
 George Pughe as Oscar Kuloff  
 Martita Hunt as Ma  
 George Hayes as Mark Struberg  
 Cameron Hall as George  
 Edana Romney as Sadie Jones  
 Bunty Payne as Tania  
 Charles Victor as Editor  
 Frederick Piper as Ginger Harris
 Bill Fraser as Maxie

Critical reception
While TV Guide called it an "outdated mystery yarn", Moria wrote that "East of Piccadilly gets by on a certain snappiness. The dialogue often has a dry wit about it."

References

External links

1941 films
1941 crime films
1941 mystery films
British crime films
British mystery films
Films directed by Harold Huth
Films based on British novels
Films based on mystery novels
Films set in London
British black-and-white films
Films with screenplays by J. Lee Thompson
Films about murder
1940s English-language films
1940s British films